Midway Island is an atoll of the United States Minor Outlying Islands.

It may also refer to:
Midway Island, Virginia, a community in Virginia
North Midway Island and South Midway Island, islands in Canada